The 1989 Kansas Jayhawks football team represented the University of Kansas as a member of the Big Eight Conference during the 1989 NCAA Division I-A football season. Led by second-year head coach Glen Mason, the Jayhawks compiled an overall record of 4–7 with a mark of 2–5 in conference play, placing sixth in the Big 8. The team played home games at Memorial Stadium in Lawrence, Kansas.

Schedule

References

Kansas
Kansas Jayhawks football seasons
Kansas Jayhawks football